is a video game artist who works for Sonic Team as the studio's creative director. His first role involved working with Sega on Sonic the Hedgehog CD as a character/sprite, special-stage, and visual designer. He is notable for creating Metal Sonic and Amy Rose. He was Sega Studio USA's art director and lead character designer until part of the studio was absorbed back into the Japanese parent company. At the American branch, he worked alongside Takashi Iizuka, as they both determined the best direction and style for their games. As of 2019, Kazuyuki is the creative director at Sonic Team.

Works

References 

Year of birth missing (living people)
Living people
Japanese art directors
Japanese artists